The Don goat breed from the Don River of the Lower Volga territory in Russia is used for the production of wool, goatskin, and milk.  It produces the highest average wool per individual goat sheared of any goat breed and produces milk with a relatively high fat content.

Sources
Don Goats

Fiber-producing goat breeds
Goatskin-producing goat breeds
Dairy goat breeds
Goat breeds originating in Russia
Goat breeds